The large ranunculus (Polymixis flavicincta) is a moth of the family Noctuidae. It is found in Europe and North Africa.

Technical description and variation

A. flavicincta F. (= flavicincta-major Esp., dysodea Esp. nec Hbn.) (33 c, d). Forewing pale grey speckled with darker olive grey, especially in median area; the edges of the stigmata, the course of the basal and
submarginal lines, and vein 1 marked by orange scales; lines dark olive; upper stigmata paler; the claviform darker; median shade distinct; hindwing grey, darker in female, with veins, cell spot, outer line, and submarginal shade darker; the species varies in depth of colour; the darker forms are known as ab. meridionalis Bsd. (33 d) from Spain and Corsica; — calvescens Bsd. (33 d) [ Polymixis rufocincta calvescens (Boisduval, 1840) ] on the other hand is a pale grey form with the yellow scaling , all but obsolete, occurring in S. France, Italy, and Sicily; ab. albescens ab. nov. (33 d) is dull white, without grey dusting except in median area, the upper stigmata also whitish; hindwing paler. Larva pale bluish green, with a darker dorsal vessel and broad pale spiracular stripe; head green.
 The wingspan is 40–50 mm. The length of the forewings is 17–22 mm.

Biology
The moth flies in one generation from the end of August to November  and are attracted to light.

The larvae feed on various grasses, such as mint, Taraxacum officinale, Senecio, Fireweed and at times even fruit bearing trees.

Subspecies
Polymixis flavicincta flavicincta 
Polymixis flavicincta meridionalis (Boisduval, 1840) (Corsica,...)
Polymixis flavicincta lajonquierei Boursin, 1963 (Spain,...)
Polymixis flavicincta caroli Plante, 1975  (Algeria,...)
Polymixis flavicincta laportei Plante, 1975  (Morocco,...)

Notes
The flight season refers to Belgium and the Netherlands. This may vary in other parts of the range.

References

External links

Large Ranunculus on UKmoths
Lepiforum.de
Vlindernet.nl 

Cuculliinae
Moths of Europe
Taxa named by Michael Denis
Taxa named by Ignaz Schiffermüller